Don't Let the Bossman Get You Down! is an album by the American blues rock musician Elvin Bishop, released in 1991.

Bishop supported the album by touring with George Thorogood.

Production
Don't Let the Bossman Get You Down! was produced by Bishop, who also wrote half of the album's songs. The title track was inspired by a dispute Bishop had with his label head, Bruce Iglauer. "Stepping Up in Class" is a cover of Jimmy McCracklin's "Steppin'". "Devil's Slide" is an instrumental, while "Rollin' with My Blues" is a tribute to Freddie King, Albert King, and B.B. King.

Critical reception

The Calgary Herald noted that there is "lots of leftover nuance from the Paul Butterfield Blues Band days to remind you that this was once a pair of hands equated with Hendrix and Clapton." The Chicago Tribune praised the "serious playing here, adding some potent slide guitar to 'Come On in This House' and some razor-sharp licks to 'Stepping Up in Class'."

The Houston Chronicle thought that "a little slide action and tasty arrangements on several cuts open the door for Bishop's considerable and road-hardened guitar work, which is as focused on record as it has been in years." The San Diego Union-Tribune determined that while the album "features the trademark Bishop humor and the occasional dash of funk, it is, for the most part, a straight blues effort."

Track listing

References

Elvin Bishop albums
1991 albums
Alligator Records albums